The Fall River Pass Ranger Station in Rocky Mountain National Park was designed by National Park Service landscape architect Daniel Ray Hull in the National Park Service Rustic style. Built in 1922, the stone structure is similar in design to the Chasm Lake Shelter. Between 1933 and 1937 the ranger station was converted to a museum. The ranger station is associated with the construction of the nearby Trail Ridge Road. Located above the tree line, the building has a trap door in the roof to allow access when the door is blocked by drifting snow.

See also
Fall River Pump House and Catchment Basin
National Register of Historic Places listings in Larimer County, Colorado

References

External links

Buildings and structures in Larimer County, Colorado
National Register of Historic Places in Rocky Mountain National Park
Government buildings completed in 1922
National Park Service ranger stations
Park buildings and structures on the National Register of Historic Places in Colorado
Historic American Buildings Survey in Colorado
National Register of Historic Places in Larimer County, Colorado
1922 establishments in Colorado
National Park Service rustic in Colorado